John-Dylan Haynes (born 1971) is a British-German brain researcher.

Haynes studied psychology and philosophy at the University of Bremen from 1992 to 1997. In 2003 he received his doctorate from the Institute of Biology in Bremen. After research stays in Magdeburg, Plymouth (Plymouth Institute of Neuroscience, 2002-2003) and London (Institute of Cognitive Neuroscience and Wellcome Department of Imaging Neuroscience, University College London, 2002-2005) he became head of a research group at the Max Planck Institute for Cognitive and Neurosciences in Leipzig in 2005.

Since 2006 he has been professor of theory and analysis of long-range brain signals at the Bernstein Center for Computational Neuroscience and at the Berlin Center for Advanced Neuroimaging (BCAN) of the Charité and the Humboldt University of Berlin. In 2007 his research group was able to predict volitional decisions up to 7 seconds before they became conscious, thus improving the time bound of 0.5 seconds found in the 1980s by Benjamin Libet. In 2008 he was a member-at-large of the Association for the Scientific Study of Consciousness's executive committee. In 2016, he got a Brain-Computer Interface Award for the work Brain-Computer Interfaces based on fMRI for Volitional Control of Amygdala and Fusiform Face Area: Applications in Autism with the TU Berlin's Neurotechnology Group.

Publications

References

German neuroscientists
1971 births
Living people